Ismail Naurdiev (born August 18, 1996) is a Chechen-born Austrian mixed martial artist currently competing in the Super Welterweight division of Brave Combat Federation. He has competed in the Welterweight division of the Ultimate Fighting Championship (UFC) and Absolute Championship Berkut (ACB).

Background
Naurdiev  was born in Grozny, Chechen Republic of Ichkeria (nowadays Chechnya, Russia) and his family left the war torn city and moved to Austria in 2004 when he was nine year old for a safe and better life.  He started training in wrestling and transitioned to MMA when he was a teenager. In the beginning of his MMA professional career, Naurdiev did not have any trainers nor sparring partners but would fought every fight that offered to him to get some fighting experience.

Mixed martial arts career

Early career
Naurdiev fought in the European-based promotions, notably Absolute Championship Akhmat (ACA), formally known as Absolute Championship Berkut (ACB), and amassed a record of 17–2 prior to joining UFC.

Ultimate Fighting Championship
Naurdiev made his promotional debut at UFC Fight Night: Błachowicz vs. Santos on February 23, 2019. He face  Michel Prazeres, replacing injured Ramazan Emeev He won the fight by unanimous decision.

On July 6, 2019, Naurdiev faced Chance Rencountre  at UFC 239. He lost the fight via unanimous decision.

Naurdiev next faced Siyar Bahadurzada at UFC Fight Night: Hermansson vs. Cannonier on September 28, 2019. He won the fight via unanimous decision.

Naurdiev faced Sean Brady on February 29, 2020, at UFC Fight Night 169. He lost the fight via unanimous decision.

On March 19, 2020, it was reported that Naurdiev parted way with UFC. Later, Naurdiev elaborated that after fighting out his four-fight rookie contract with a record of 2–2, the organization was not interested in re-signing him.

Post-UFC career
On August 24, 2020, news surfaced that Naurdiev had signed with Elite MMA Championship and was expected to make his promotional debut in the promotion's welterweight grand prix at EMC 5 on September 5, 2020. He faced Tymoteusz Łopaczyk and won the fight via unanimous decision, advancing to the grand prix final.

In the final, Naurdiev was expected to face Amiran Gogoladze at EMC 6 on October 31, 2020. However, Naurdiev withdrew from the bout due to an injury prior to the whole event being postponed due to the COVID-19 pandemic.

Brave Combat Federation 
On February 26, 2021, Naurdiev announced that he signed a multi-fight contract with Brave Combat Federation. Subsequently, it was announced that Naurdiev will be challenging Jarrah Al-Silawi for the BRAVE CF Super Welterweight Championship at Brave CF 50 on April 1, 2021. He lost in the second round after he injured his leg from a kick.

Naurdiev faced Olli Santalahti on September 25, 2021, at Brave CF 54. He won the bout via unanimous decision.

Naurdiev faced Bekten Zheenbekov on June 18, 2022 at Brave CF 59. He won the bout via TKO stoppage in the first round. 

Naurdiev faced Marcin Bandel for the vacant Brave CF Super Welterweight Championship at Brave CF 63. He lost the bout in the first round after being dropped by Bandel and submitted with an armbar.

Naurdiev looked to rebound against Vadim Kutsy on December 17, 2022 at Brave CF 68, however he lost the bout via TKO stoppage in the first round.

Personal life
Naurdiev earned his moniker "The Austrian Wonderboy" due to his flashy, stylist and wild spinning kicks skills.

Championships and accomplishments
Absolute Championship Berkut
Knockout of the Night (One time)  

Aggrelin 
AG Welterweight Championship (One time)

World Freefight Challenge 
Knockout of the Night (One time)

Mixed martial arts record

|-
|Loss
|align=center|22–7
|Vadim Kutsy
|TKO (punches)
|Brave CF 68
|
|align=center|1
|align=center|3:23
|Düsseldorf, Germany
|
|-
|Loss
|align=center|22–6
|Marcin Bandel
|Submission (armbar)
|Brave CF 63
|
|align=center|1
|align=center|1:20
|Isa Town, Bahrain
|
|-
|Win
|align=center|22–5
|Bekten Zheenbekov
|TKO (punches)
|Brave CF 59
|
|align=center|1
|align=center|2:26
|Bukhara, Uzbekistan
|
|-
|Win
|align=center|21–5
|Olli Santalahti
|Decision (unanimous)
|Brave CF 54
|
|align=center|3
|align=center|5:00
|Konin, Poland
|
|-
|Loss
|align=center|20–5
|Jarrah Al-Silawi
|TKO (leg kicks)
|Brave CF 50
|
|align=center|2
|align=center|1:19
|Arad, Bahrain
|
|-
|Win
|align=center|20–4
|Tymoteusz Łopaczyk
|Decision (unanimous)
|EMC 5
|
|align=center|3
|align=center|5:00
|Düsseldorf, Germany
|
|-
|Loss
|align=center|19–4
|Sean Brady
|Decision (unanimous)
|UFC Fight Night: Benavidez vs. Figueiredo 
|
|align=center|3
|align=center|5:00
|Norfolk, Virginia, United States
|
|-
| Win
| align=center| 19–3
|Siyar Bahadurzada
|Decision (unanimous)
|UFC Fight Night: Hermansson vs. Cannonier 
|
|align=center|3
|align=center|5:00
|Copenhagen, Denmark
|
|-
| Loss
| align=center| 18–3
| Chance Rencountre
| Decision (unanimous)
| UFC 239
| 
| align=center| 3
| align=center| 5:00
| Las Vegas, Nevada, United States
|
|-
| Win
| align=center| 18–2
| Michel Prazeres
| Decision (unanimous)
| UFC Fight Night: Błachowicz vs. Santos
| 
| align=center| 3
| align=center| 5:00
| Prague, Czech Republic
|
|-
| Win
| align=center| 17–2
| Paulistenio Rocha
| TKO (punches)
| X Fight Nights 16
| 
| align=center| 1
| align=center| 0:36
| Wien, Austria
|
|-
| Win
| align=center| 16–2
| Georgi Valentinov
| KO (spinning wheel kick and punches)
| ACB 74
| 
| align=center| 1
| align=center| 3:10
| Vienna, Austria
|
|-
| Loss
| align=center| 15–2
| Ismael de Jesus
| Decision (unanimous)
| ACB 70
| 
| align=center| 3
| align=center| 5:00
| Sheffield, England
|
|-
| Win
| align=center| 15–1
| Ben Alloway
| KO (kick to the body)
| ACB 60
| 
| align=center| 1
| align=center| 2:24
| Vienna, Austria
|
|-
| Win
| align=center| 14–1
| Andrei Vasinca 
| TKO (knee and punches)
| ACB 52
| 
| align=center| 1
| align=center| 1:28
| Vienna, Austria
|
|-
| Win
| align=center| 13–1
| Lászlò Szögyényi
| TKO (punches)
| WFC 21
| 
| align=center| 2
| align=center| 1:49
| Bad Voeslau, Austria
|
|-
| Win
| align=center| 12–1
| Garik Shahbabyan
| Submission (arm-triangle choke)
| Aggrelin 14
| 
| align=center| 2
| align=center| 2:41
| Salzburg, Austria
|
|-
| Win
| align=center| 11–1
| Daniel Skibiński
| KO (knee)
| WFC 20
| 
| align=center| 1
| align=center| 0:40
| Bad Vöslau, Austria
|
|-
| Win
| align=center| 10–1
| David Mate
| TKO (punches)
| KraftHerr Fight Night
| 
| align=center| 1
| align=center| 1:15
| St. Polten, Austria
|
|-
| Win
| align=center| 9–1
| Leonardo D'Auria
| TKO (punches)
| Austrian Fight Challenge 2
| 
| align=center| 1
| align=center| N/A
| Vienna, Austria
|
|-
| Win
| align=center| 8–1
| Asmir Sadiković
| Submission (triangle choke)
| NAAFS: Europe
| 
| align=center| 2
| align=center| 1:03
| Split, Croatia
|
|-
| Win
| align=center| 7–1
| Mikko Ahmala
| TKO (punches and elbows)
| Cage 30
| 
| align=center| 1
| align=center| 2:27
| Leonding, Austria
|
|-
| Win
| align=center| 6–1
| Adnan Hadzic
| Submission
| Fight Night Leonding
| 
| align=center| 1
| align=center| 1:28
| Leonding, Austria
|
|-
| Win
| align=center| 5–1
| Ibo Can
| TKO (punches)
| Charity Fight Night 2
| 
| align=center| 1
| align=center| 2:00
| Dornbirn, Austria
|
|-
| Loss
| align=center| 4–1
| Cam Kaya
| Submission (triangle choke)
| German MMA Championship 5
| 
| align=center| 1
| align=center| 0:40
| Castrop-Rauxel, Germany
|
|-
| Win
| align=center| 4–0
| Uros Pavlovic
| TKO
| Cage Fight Events Europe: Salzburger MMA Challenge
| 
| align=center| 1
| align=center| N/A
| Salzburg, Austria
|
|-
| Win
| align=center| 3–0
| Robert Oganesyan
| Submission (rear-naked choke)
| Fight Night Linz
| 
| align=center| 1
| align=center| 4:26
| Leonding, Austria
|
|-
| Win
| align=center| 2–0
| Abdul Shaliqhi
| Submission (rear-naked choke)
| Respect Austria 1
| 
| align=center| 1
| align=center| 3:00
| Freistadt, Austria
|
|-
| Win
| align=center| 1–0
| Alic Eldridz
| Decision
| KOTR Austria: King of the Ring
| 
| align=center| 3
| align=center| 5:00
| Salzburg, Austria
|
|-

See also
 List of current Brave CF fighters
 List of male mixed martial artists

References

External links
 
 

Living people
1996 births
Austrian male mixed martial artists
Chechen mixed martial artists
Welterweight mixed martial artists
Mixed martial artists utilizing wrestling
Sportspeople from Salzburg
Austrian people of Chechen descent
Ultimate Fighting Championship male fighters